Xujiazhuang Township is a township under the administration of Jizhou City in southern Hebei province, China, located about  west of downtown Jizhou. , it has 28 villages under its administration.

See also 
 List of township-level divisions of Hebei

References 

Township-level divisions of Hebei
Jizhou City